The Archdeacon of Man (sometimes incorrectly referred to as Archdeacon of the Isle of Man) is a senior cleric second only to the Bishop of Sodor and Man in the Anglican Diocese of Sodor and Man (which comprises the Isle of Man). This is unusual, as in the Church of England deans are usually the senior priests of the diocese. In Sodor and Man, however, the role of dean was fulfilled by the Bishop for many years, until becoming distinct again only in October 2011. According to advice given by Queen Elizabeth II, Lord of Mann, the Archdeacon "is the bishop's second in command", and this seniority is reflected, e.g., on Tynwald Day in the Order of the Procession, and by the fact that until 1919 the Archdeacon of Man was an ex officio member of the Legislative Council.

List of archdeacons
Abbreviations used in the list:

 aft. = after
 bef. = before

 d. = died in office
 res. = resigned

 ret. = retired

Medieval
bef. 1248 – 1249 (res.): Laurence (elected bishop)
bef. 1257 – aft. 1257: Dompnalds
bef. 1270 – aft. 1330: Makaboy
bef. 1320 – aft. 1331: Cormac
bef. 1408 – aft. 1408: Patrick
bef. 1482 – aft. 1482: Gilbert
bef. 1497 – 1497 (res.): Thomas Clerke
bef. 1513 – aft. 1513: John Walles
bef. 1534 – aft. 1534: ? Gorstellaw

Early modern
1546 – 1557: William McCrystyn
bef. 1544 – bef. 1552 (d.): Gilbert Latham/de Latham/Lathum
bef. 1557 – aft. 1561: Richard Gorstyllaw/Gorstale
bef. 1577 – aft. 1582: Hugh Holland
1587 – 7 August 1633 (d.): John Phillips (also Archdeacon of Cleveland, 1601 – 1619; Bishop of Sodor and Man from 1605, when archdeacon in commendam)
bef. 1595 – aft. 1594: Henry Curwyn (opposed Phillips)
1634 – bef. 1643: John Broxop
bef. 1640 – 1661 (res.): Samuel Rutter
bef. 1663 – 1667 (d.): Jonathan Fletcher
14 September 1667 – 1688 (d.): William Urquhart
bef. 1689 – 12 April 1695 (d.): John Lomax/Loman
16 July 1696 – 1700 (res.): Archippus Kippax
10 June 1700 – 3 October 1701 (d.): Christopher Marsden
10 July 1703 – 20 December 1718 (d.): Samuel Wattleworth/Waltleworth
1718 – 25 May 1727 (res.): Robert Horrobin
6 September 1727 – 11 May 1760 (d.): John Kippax
18 July 1760 – 14 September 1787 (d.): William Mylrea
5 November 1787 – 7 December 1803 (res.): Lord George Murray
1803 – 1808: Lord Charles Murray-Aynsley
1808 – 1814 The Hon. George Murray
1814 – 29 March 1832 (d.): Daniel Mylrea
22 May 1832 – 25 June 1839 (res.): Benjamin Philpot
19 September 1839 – 8 February 1844 (d.): Cecil Hall
17 April 1844 – 26 February 1886 (d.): Joseph Moore

Late modern
1886 – 1894 (res.): Joshua Hughes-Games
1895 – 13 May 1912 (d.): Hugh Gill
1912 – 1938 (ret.): John Kewley (afterwards archdeacon emeritus)
1938 – 28 March 1958 (d.): Vincent Stockwood
1958 – 2 February 1964 (d.): Ernest Stenning
1964 – 1978 (ret.): Edward Glass (afterwards archdeacon emeritus)
1978 – 1982 (ret.): Arthur Clague
1982 – 1996 (ret.): David Willoughby
1996 – 2005 (ret.): Brian Partington (afterwards archdeacon emeritus)
2005 – 2011 (ret.): Brian Smith (afterwards archdeacon emeritus)
2011 – 2021 (ret.): Andie Brown
19 June 2022present: Irene Cowell

Notes

References

Sources

Archdeacon of Man